Michael O'Sullivan may refer to:

Individual
Michael O'Sullivan (politician) (1784–1839), Lower Canada lawyer, militia officer, politician and judge
Sir Michael Neil O'Sullivan (1900–1968), Australian politician and lawyer
Michael O'Sullivan (actor) (1934–1971), American actor
Mickey O'Sullivan (born 1952), Irish retired Gaelic football manager, selector, and former player
Michael O'Sullivan (poet) (born 1959), Irish poet
Michael O'Sullivan (footballer) (born 1962), former Australian rules footballer
Michael O'Sullivan (cricketer) (born 1973), former English cricketer
Michael O'Sullivan (hurler) (born 1990), Irish hurler who played for Cork
Michael O'Sullivan (soccer) (born 1995), English-American soccer player

Fictional
Michael O'Sullivan, character in Road to Perdition

See also
Michael Sullivan (disambiguation)
O'Sullivan (surname)